S. Robert "Bob" Contiguglia (born September 14, 1941) served as President of the United States Soccer Federation from 1998 to 2006. Among his achievements as President of U.S. Soccer were: successfully hosting the 1999 Women's World Cup, convincing FIFA to relocate the 2003 Women's World Cup to the United States after the original plans to host it in China fell through, the U.S. women's team winning gold at the 2004 Summer Olympics, and hiring Bruce Arena as coach for the United States men's national team. In May 2018, Contiguglia was selected to the National Soccer Hall of Fame.

Contiguglia has played, coached, and managed soccer at several different levels. He previously ran for President of U.S. Soccer in 1984, but lost to Werner Fricker. He served as President of U.S. Youth Soccer from 1990 to 1996.

Contiguglia was born in New York City and raised on Long Island. He later became a resident of Colorado. He earned an undergraduate degree at Columbia University, majoring in zoology with a minor in English. He earned a medical degree at the SUNY Health Science Center at Brooklyn, and became a  nephrologist.

References

American nephrologists
Association football executives
American soccer chairmen and investors
1941 births
Living people
Presidents of the United States Soccer Federation
SUNY Downstate Medical Center alumni
Columbia Lions men's soccer players
Association footballers not categorized by position
Association football players not categorized by nationality
National Soccer Hall of Fame members